The list of census-designated places in Oklahoma contains those areas defined by the US Census Bureau as CDPs. A CDP is a "statistical entity ... comprising a densely settled concentration of population that is not within an incorporated place". CDPs have no governmental powers or cartographic meaning, although they do have boundaries as defined by the Census Bureau. All CDPs, nationwide, were created in 1980 or later; while they serve the census bureau for research purposes, they do not replace the pre-existent organized communities (towns, etc.) which they encompass. For an unknown reason the majority of CDPs in Oklahoma are in the northeastern quarter of the state.

Many of the CDPs were named for communities located within the defined entities, or for nearby communities. Where known, the associated communities are also listed for reference. The sources for the associated communities are primarily from Shirk's Oklahoma Place Names, the United States Geological Survey, or the list of unincorporated communities in Oklahoma.

List of CDPs

A
 Akins – Sequoyah County
 Albany – Bryan County
 Arpelar – Pittsburg County

B
 Badger Lee – Seqoyah County
 Ballou – Mayes County
 Bee – Johnston County
 Belfonte – Sequoyah County
 Bell – Adair County
 Bison – Garfield County
 Blackgum – Sequoyah County
 Blue – Bryan County
 Box – Sequoyah County
 Brent – Sequoyah County
 Briggs – Cherokee County
 Brush Creek – Delaware County
 Brushy – Sequoyah County
 Bull Hollow – Delaware County
 Bushyhead – Rogers County
 Butler – Delaware County

C
 Carlisle – Sequoyah County
 Cartwright – Bryan County
 Cayuga – Delaware County
 Cedar Crest – Mayes County
 Cherry Tree – Adair County
 Chester – Major County
 Chewey – Adair County
 Christie – Adair County
 Cleora – Delaware County
 Cloud Creek – Delaware County
 Copeland – Delaware County

D
 Dale – Pottawatomie County
 Deer Lick – Delaware County
 Dennis – Delaware County
 Dodge – Delaware County
 Dotyville – Ottawa County
 Dripping Springs – Delaware County
 Drowning Creek – Delaware County
 Dry Creek – Cherokee County
 Duchess Landing – McIntosh County
 Dwight Mission – Sequoyah County

E
 Eagletown – McCurtain County
 Eldon – Cherokee County
 Elm Grove – Adair County
 Evening Shade – Sequoyah County

F
 Fairfield – Adair County
 Felt – Cimarron County
 Flint Creek – Delaware County
 Flute Springs – Sequoyah County

G
 Gideon – Cherokee County
 Grandview – Cherokee County
 Grant – Choctaw County
 Greasy – Adair County
 Gregory – Rogers County

I
 Indianola – Delaware County
 Iron Post – Mayes County
 Isabella – Major County

J
 Justice – Rogers County

K
 Kenton – Cimarron County
 Kenwood – Delaware County
 Keys – Cherokee County

L
 Lane – Atoka County
 Leach – Delaware County
 Lebanon – Marshall County
 Liberty – Sequoyah County
 Limestone – Rogers County
 Long – Sequoyah County
 Longtown – Pittsburg County
 Lost City – Cherokee County
 Lucien – Noble County
 Lyons Switch – Adair County

M
 Marietta – Adair County
 Mazie – Mayes County
 McCord – Osage County
 Meridian – Stephens County
 Mulberry – Adair County
 Murphy – Mayes County

N
 Narcissa – Ottawa County
 Nardin – Kay County
 Nescatunga – Alfalfa County
 New Eucha – Delaware County
 Nicut – Sequoyah County
 Notchietown – Sequoyah County

O
 Oakhurst – Creek and Tulsa counties
 Old Eucha – Delaware County
 Old Green – Adair County

P
 Park Hill – Cherokee County
 Peavine – Adair County
 Peggs – Cherokee County
 Pettit – Cherokee County
 Pin Oak Acres – Mayes County
 Piney – Adair County
 Pinhook Corner – Sequoyah County
 Proctor – Adair County
 Pump Back – Mayes County

R
 Redbird Smith – Sequoyah County
 Remy – Sequoyah County
 River Bottom – Muskogee County
 Rocky Ford – Delaware County
 Rocky Mountain – Adair County
 Rose – Mayes County

S
 Salem – Adair County
 Sams Corner – Mayes County
 Sand Hill – Muskogee County
 Sequoyah – Rogers County
 Shady Grove – Cherokee County
 Shady Grove – McIntosh County
 Short – Sequoyah County
 Simms – Muskogee County
 Snake Creek – Mayes County
 Sour John – Muskogee County
 Sparrowhawk – Cherokee County
 Steely Hollow – Cherokee County
 Stoney Point – Sequoyah County
 Swink – Choctaw County
 Sycamore – Delaware County

T
 Tagg Flats – Delaware County
 Tenkiller – Cherokee County
 Teresita – Cherokee County
 Texanna – McIntosh County
 Tiawah – Rogers County
 Titanic – Adair County
 Turley – Tulsa County
 Turpin – Beaver County
 Tuskahoma – Pushmataha County
 Twin Oaks – Delaware County

W
 Wauhillau – Adair County
 Welling – Cherokee County
 West Peavine – Adair County
 White Oak – Craig County
 Whitesboro – Le Flore County
 White Water – Delaware County
 Wickliffe – Mayes County
 Woodall – Cherokee County

Z
 Zeb – Cherokee County
 Zena – Delaware County
 Zion – Adair County

References

 
Oklahoma